Ceres most commonly refers to:
 Ceres (dwarf planet), the largest asteroid 
 Ceres (mythology), the Roman goddess of agriculture

Ceres may also refer to:

Places

Brazil
 Ceres, Goiás, Brazil
 Ceres Microregion, in north-central Goiás state, Brazil

United States 
 Ceres, California
 Ceres, Georgia
 Ceres, Iowa
 Ceres, New York, a community that also extends into Pennsylvania
 Ceres, Oklahoma, a community in Noble County
 Ceres, Virginia
 Ceres, Washington
 Ceres, West Virginia
 Ceres Township, McKean County, Pennsylvania

Other countries
 Ceres, Santa Fe, Argentina
 Ceres, Victoria, Australia
 Ceres, Piedmont, Italy
 Ceres, Fife, Scotland
 Ceres, Western Cape, South Africa
 Ceres, Limpopo, South Africa
 Ceres Nunataks, Antarctica
 Ceres Koekedouw Dam, dam on the Koekedouw River, near Ceres, Western Cape, South Africa

Acronyms 
 CERES (satellite), a planned French spy satellite program
 California Environmental Resources Evaluation System
 Center for Eurasian, Russian, and East European Studies at Georgetown University
 Centre for Research on Energy Security (CeRES), an Indian research center on geopolitics and energy
 CERES Community Environment Park (Centre for Education and Research in Environmental Strategies), a community environmental park in Melbourne, Australia.
 Clouds and the Earth's Radiant Energy System, an ongoing NASA meteorological experiment.
 Coalition for Environmentally Responsible Economies 
  (French: Center of Socialist Studies, Research and Education), a left-wing political organization founded by Jean-Pierre Chevènement

Aircraft, rocket, transport, and vessels

Aircraft, locomotive, car
 CAC Ceres, a crop-duster aircraft manufactured in Australia
 Ceres, a West Cornwall Railway steam locomotive
 Toyota Corolla Ceres a compact, 4-door hardtop sold in Japan
 Kia Ceres, a version of the Kia Bongo, a 2-door pick up truck

Ships and submarines
 Ceres (East Indiaman), three vessels of the British East India Company
 , several ships
 HMS Ceres, three ships and three shore establishments of the British Royal Navy
 , several ships of the French Navy
 USS Ceres (1856), a Union Navy steamship during the American Civil War

Rocket 
 Ceres-1, a PR of China four stage rocket

Arts, entertainment, and media
 Ceres (band), a band from Australia
 Ceres (sculpture), a c.1770 statuette by Augustin Pajou
Ceres (2005), an orchestral work by Mark-Anthony Turnage
 Sailor Ceres, a character in Sailor Moon media
 The titular character of Ceres, Celestial Legend, a manga and mini anime series
 Ceres Space Colony, from the video game Super Metroid

Brands and enterprises 
 Ceres (organization), a coalition of investors and environmentalists (formerly the Coalition for Environmentally Responsible Economies)
 Ceres Brewery, a brewery in Aarhus, Denmark
 Ceres Fruit Juices, a South African juice company
 Ceres Hellenic Shipping Enterprises, a Greek shipping company
 Ceres, Inc., a US energy crop seeds developer
 Ceres Liner, a bus company in the Philippines

Education
 Ceres Connection, a cooperative program between MIT's Lincoln Laboratory and the Society for Science and the Public dedicated for promoting science education
 Ceres School, an historic school building located at Ceres in Allegany County, New York
 Ceres (women's fraternity), a women's fraternity focused on agriculture

Sport
 Ceres Futebol Clube, a Brazilian football team from the city of Rio de Janeiro
 Sportsklubben Ceres, a Norwegian sports team from Skedsmo, Akershus
 United City F.C., a Philippine football team formerly known as Ceres–Negros F.C.

People
 Dragoș Cereș (born 2004), a Moldovan chess master

Other uses 
 Ceres (workstation), a computer workstation built at ETH Zürich
 Ceres series (disambiguation), several series of postage stamps representing the goddess Ceres
 Ceres Chess Engine, an experimental chess engine that uses Leela Chess Zero networks
 Plural of cere

See also 
 Colonization of Ceres
 Keres (mythology), death spirits unconnected with Ceres
 Seres (disambiguation)